Xerochrysum subundulatum (commonly named the alpine everlasting or orange everlasting) is a flowering plant in the family Asteraceae, native to Australia, growing in Victoria, New South Wales and Tasmania.

It is an ascending or erect annual. The plant normally grows to about 60 cm in height, and is usually simple or few-branched. Inflorescence bracts are papery and golden-yellow in colour.  It has thin, fleshy roots with a mean maximum diameter of 2mm.

Seedlings are tolerant of existing adult competition.  Its post-fire regenerative strategy is by both seed and sprout.

References

subundulatum
Flora of New South Wales
Flora of Tasmania
Flora of Victoria (Australia)